Echo is a genus of damselflies belonging to the family Calopterygidae. There are five species. A sixth, Echo maxima, is sometimes included, but it probably belongs to a different genus.

This genus is distributed in Asia, especially Southeast Asia.

Species include:
Echo candens Zhang, Hämäläinen, & Cai, 2015
Echo margarita Selys, 1853
Echo modesta Laidlaw, 1902
Echo perornata Yu & Hämäläinen, 2012
Echo uniformis Selys, 1879

References

Calopterygidae
Zygoptera genera
Taxa named by Edmond de Sélys Longchamps